Canada–Uruguay relations are foreign relations between Canada and the Republic of Uruguay. Both countries are members of the Cairns Group, the Organization of American States and the United Nations.

History
Canada and Uruguay established diplomatic relations in January 1951. In 1953, Canada's first appointed ambassador to Uruguay was based in Buenos Aires, Argentina. In April 2001, Uruguayan President Jorge Batlle paid a visit to Canada to attend the 3rd Summit of the Americas held in Quebec City.

In November 2017, Uruguay co-hosted with Canada the United Nations Peacekeeping Defence Ministerial conference in Vancouver, British Columbia. Uruguay has endorsed the Vancouver Principles on Peacekeeping and the Prevention of the Recruitment and Use of Child Soldiers as well as Canada's Elsie Initiative for Women in Peace Operations. In February 2020, Canadian Leader of the Government in the House of Commons, Pablo Rodríguez, paid a visit to Uruguay to attend the inauguration for President Luis Alberto Lacalle Pou.

Bilateral agreements
Both nations have signed a few agreements such as a Foreign Investment Promotion and Protection Agreement (1999); Social Security Agreement (2002); Audiovisual Co-Production Agreement (2005); Air Transport Agreement (2012) and a Tax Information Exchange Agreement (2014).

Migration and Tourism
In 2016, there were approximately 5,500 Canadians who claimed to be of Uruguayan descent. In Uruguay, the Canadian expat community is estimated to number around 500 citizens. 15,000 Canadian tourists visited Uruguay in 2016.

Trade

In 2017, trade between Canada and Uruguay totaled US$174 million. Canada's main exports to Uruguay include: afuels, gas and oil; electrics and mechanicals manufactures; fertilizers; pharmaceuticals and plastics and by-products. Uruguay's main exports to Canada include: frozen boneless meat, fresh or dried citrus and fresh berries. In March 2018, Mercosur trade bloc ministers (which includes Uruguay) agreed to launch formal negotiations toward a comprehensive Canada-Mercosur free trade agreement (FTA). Canadian multinational companies such as BlackBerry, Scotiabank and Thomson Reuters operate in Uruguay.

Resident diplomatic missions
 Canada has an embassy in Montevideo.
 Uruguay has an embassy in Ottawa and consulates-general in Montreal and Toronto.

See also 
 Uruguayan Canadians

References 

 

 
Uruguay
Bilateral relations of Uruguay